Petrus Ua Mórda (Anglicised: Peter O'Mordha, (O')More, or (O')Moore) was Bishop of Clonfert from circa 1150 to 1171.

He appears to have been a member of a family from Ui Maine, one of the oldest and largest kingdoms located in Connacht, Ireland. Ua Mórda was abbot of Grellach dá Iach, the first of three sites inhabited by the Cistercians, and who finally settled at Boyle Abbey. In around 1150 AD, he became Bishop of Clonfert; styled as Bishop of Cluain-fearta-Brenainn or Bishop of Ui Maine.

He was greatly esteemed as "a divine and learned monk". He drowned in the River Shannon, near Port-da-Chaineg, on 27 December 1171.

A Dionysius Ó Mórdha would be Bishop of Clonfert from 1509 to 1534. The surname is nowadays rendered as Ó Mórdha and Moore.

References

 Part 27 of Annals of the Four Masters
 Part 719 of The Annals of Ulster
 
 
 MacLysaght, Edward (1978). The Surnames of Ireland.
 

People from County Galway
Medieval Gaels from Ireland
12th-century Roman Catholic bishops in Ireland
Bishops of Clonfert
1171 deaths
Deaths by drowning
Year of birth unknown
Accidental deaths in Ireland